Archelaus was bishop of Caesarea in Cappadocia around the 5th century CE.

Works
Archelaus wrote a work against the heresy of the Messalians -- that is, the sect called the Euchites -- which is referred to by Photius. Scholar William Cave places his time around 440 CE.

See also
List of Christian heresies

Notes

5th-century bishops in Roman Anatolia
5th-century Christian theologians
5th-century Byzantine writers